Elections to North Lincolnshire Council were held on 1 May 2003.  The Labour Party lost its overall majority to the Conservative Party.  Overall turnout was 51.3%.

Election result

2003 English local elections
2003
2000s in Lincolnshire